Lennert may refer to:

 Karl Lennert (1921–2012), German physician and pathologist
 Lennert lymphoma, a T-cell lymphoma

See also
 Lehnert, a German surname 
 Lennart, a German and Scandinavian given name